Delamere station  may refer to:
Delamere railway station, a railway station in Cheshire, England
Delamere Station (pastoral lease), a cattle farm in Northern Territory, Australia

See also
Delamere (disambiguation)